is a Japanese actress, model  and tarento who has appeared in a number of feature films and television programmes. Sakurai is represented with Incent.

Biography
Sakurai's acting debut was in the play Soreiyu in May 2016. Later in July her first drama appearance was in Nippon TV's Soshite, Dare mo inaku natta.

Filmography

TV series

Film

Japanese dub

Stage

Advertisements

Advertising

Newspapers

Bibliography

References

External links
 
 
Sanyo Shimbun "San Digi ☓ Okayama Kōkoku Onsen: Motomu, Momoiro Kantei-shi" 

Japanese female models
21st-century Japanese actresses
1997 births
Living people
People from Okayama
Models from Okayama Prefecture